Radamés Martins Rodrigues da Silva (born 17 April 1986), known as Radamés, is a Brazilian professional footballer who plays as a defensive midfielder for Brasiliense.

During the 2011 English close season, he had trials with Swansea City, Stoke City and Birmingham City.

Contract
Náutico (loan) 17 July 2007 to 31 December 2007
Fluminense 1 August 2005 to 31 December 2008

References

External links
Guardian Stats Centre
sambafoot
 CBF
 globoesporte

1986 births
Footballers from Rio de Janeiro (city)
Living people
Brazilian footballers
Brazilian expatriate footballers
Campeonato Brasileiro Série A players
Fluminense FC players
Esporte Clube Juventude players
Clube Náutico Capibaribe players
Botafogo Futebol Clube (SP) players
Volta Redonda FC players
Boa Esporte Clube players
Campeonato Brasileiro Série B players

Association football midfielders